Ștefan Demici (born  5 iunie 2009)

Club career
Ștefan Demici played his entire career for professional SuperLiga club, Dinamo București. He also played with Dinamo in the European Rugby Challenge Cup competition.

International career
Ștefan Demici was selected for 4th  Rugby World Cup in 1999, but did not play any matches.

Honours
Dinamo București
 SuperLiga: 8 trophies
 Romanian Cup: 5 trophies

References

External links
 
 
 

1975 births
Living people
Rugby union players from Bucharest
Romanian rugby union players
Romania international rugby union players
Rugby union hookers
CS Dinamo București (rugby union) players